All Night Long: An Introduction is a compilation album by the British hard rock band Rainbow, released in 2002.

All songs are studio cuts, save for a live version of "All Night Long", which was recorded at Rainbow's headlining appearance at the first Monsters of Rock festival at Castle Donington, England in 1980. This recording had not been available on CD prior to this release.

Track listing
"Temple of the King"  – 4:42
"Tarot Woman"  – 5:57
"Stargazer"  – 8:25
"Lady of the Lake"  – 3:39
"Eyes of the World"  – 6:41
"All Night Long" (live)  – 6:41
"Love's No Friend"  – 4:52
"Spotlight Kid"  – 4:54
"Stone Cold"  – 5:16
"Fire Dance"  – 4:31
"Weiss Heim"  – 5:17

References

Rainbow (rock band) compilation albums
2002 compilation albums
Polydor Records compilation albums